Stefano Antezza (born 13 January 1996) is an Italian football player. He plays for Fano.

Club career

Spezia

Loan to Como 
On 9 July 2016, Antezza was signed by Serie C side Como on a season-long loan deal. On 31 July he made his debut for Como in a 3–0 home win over Valdinievole Montecatini in the first round of Coppa Italia, he was replaced by Michele Mandelli in the 78th minute. On 28 August he made his Serie C debut for Como as a substitute replacing Davide Di Quinzio in the 87th minute of 2–2 away draw against Arezzo. On 2 October he scored his first professional goal, as a substitute, in the 90th minute of a 2–1 home win over Racing Club Roma. Seven days later, Antezza played his first match as a starter in Serie C, a 1–0 away win over Prato, he was replaced by Filippo Damian in the 82nd minute. On 20 November he played his first entire match for Como, a 2–2 home draw against Cremonese. On 18 February 2017 he was sent-off with a red card in the 53rd minute of a 3–2 away defeat against Racing Club Roma. Antezza ended his loan to Como with 19 appearances, 1 goal and 1 assist.

Loan to Renate 
On 4 July 2017, Antezza was loaned to Serie C club Renate on a season-long loan deal. On 30 July he made his debut for Renate as a substitute replacing Antonio Palma in the 75th minute of a first round of Coppa Italia. On 27 August, Antezza made his Serie C debut for Renate as a substitute replacing Lorenzo Simonetti in the 64th minute and he scored his first goal for Renate in the 85th minute of a 3–0 home win over Padova. On 3 September he played his first entire match for Renate, a 1–0 away win over FeralpiSalò. Antezza ended his season-long loan to Renate with 14 appearances, including only 4 as a starter, and 1 goal.

Loan to Südtirol 
On 10 July 2018, Antezza was signed by Serie C side Südtirol on a season-long loan deal. On 29 July he made his debut for Südtirol as a substitute replacing Francesco De Rose in the 82nd minute of a 2–1 home win over Albalonga in the first round of Coppa Italia. On 17 September he made his Serie C debut for Südtirol as a substitute replacing Luca Beradocco in the 83rd minute of a 1–0 hom win over Teramo. On 7 October, Antezza played his first entire match for Südtirol, a 0–0 home draw against AlbinoLeffe. On 9 December he received a double yellow card, as a substitute, in the 66th minute of a 1–0 away defeat against Sambenedettese. Antezza ended his loan to Südtirol with 26 appearances, but only 3 as a starter.

Viterbese Castrense 
On 26 July 2019, Antezza joined to Serie C club Viterbese Castrense on an undisclosed fee.

Paganese
On 19 January 2021 he moved to Paganese.

International career 
Antezza represented Italy at Under-16 and Under-17 levels. On 10 April 2012, Antezza made his debut at U-16 level in a 2–0 away win over Scotland U-16, he was replaced by Alberto Tibolla in the 51st minute. On 31 August 2012, Antezza made his debut at U-17 level as a substitute replacing Gennaro Tutino in the 60th minute of a 1–0 home defeat against Portugal U-17.

Career statistics

Club

References

External links
 

1996 births
Footballers from Bari
Living people
Italian footballers
Association football midfielders
Italy youth international footballers
Spezia Calcio players
Como 1907 players
A.C. Renate players
F.C. Südtirol players
U.S. Viterbese 1908 players
Paganese Calcio 1926 players
Alma Juventus Fano 1906 players
Serie C players
Serie D players